Dihydroxyphenylethylene glycol (DOPEG) is a metabolite of norepinephrine through monoamine oxidase.

References 

Catechols
Phenolic human metabolites